The Canton of Charmes is a French administrative and electoral grouping of communes in the Vosges département of eastern France and in the region of Grand Est. The canton has its administrative centre at Charmes.

Composition
At the French canton reorganisation which came into effect in March 2015, the canton was expanded from 26 to 52 communes:

Avillers
Avrainville
Battexey
Bettegney-Saint-Brice
Bettoncourt
Bouxières-aux-Bois
Bouxurulles
Brantigny
Bult
Chamagne
Charmes
Châtel-sur-Moselle
Clézentaine
Damas-aux-Bois
Deinvillers
Derbamont
Essegney
Évaux-et-Ménil
Fauconcourt
Florémont
Gircourt-lès-Viéville
Gugney-aux-Aulx
Hadigny-les-Verrières
Haillainville
Hardancourt
Hergugney
Jorxey
Langley
Madegney
Marainville-sur-Madon
Moriville
Moyemont
Nomexy
Ortoncourt
Pont-sur-Madon
Portieux
Rapey
Regney
Rehaincourt
Romont
Rugney
Saint-Genest
Saint-Maurice-sur-Mortagne
Saint-Vallier
Savigny
Socourt
Ubexy
Varmonzey
Vincey
Vomécourt
Vomécourt-sur-Madon
Xaronval

References

Charmes